The Youths is a 1929 German silent film directed by Edmund Heuberger and starring Georgia Lind, Daisy D'Ora, and Anton Pointner. It was shot at the Staaken Studios in Berlin. The film's art direction was by Gustav A. Knauer and Willy Schiller.

Cast

References

External links

1929 films
Films of the Weimar Republic
Films directed by Edmund Heuberger
German silent feature films
German black-and-white films
Films shot at Staaken Studios